Zehden is a surname. Notable people with the surname include:

Emmy Zehden (1900–1944), German Jehovah's witness
Alfred Zehden (1876–1948), German inventor of maglev

See also
 Cedynia, town in Poland, formerly Zehden, Brandenburg, Germany